Mahomet is a village in Champaign County, Illinois, United States. The population was 9,434 at the 2020 census. Mahomet is located approximately 10 miles northwest of Champaign at the junction of Interstate 74 and IL 47.

Geography
Mahomet is located at  (40.192384, -88.402115).

Demographics

As of the 2020 census there were 9,434 people, 3,030 households, and 2,501 families residing in the village. The racial makeup of the village was 89.47% White, 1.08% African American, 0.19% Native American, 2.78% Asian, 0.06% Pacific Islander, 0.81% from other races, and 5.61% from two or more races. Hispanic or Latino of any race were 3.51% of the population.

There were 3,030 households, out of which 85.18% had children under the age of 18 living with them, 72.24% were married couples living together, 8.78% had a female householder with no husband present, and 17.46% were non-families. 14.52% of all households were made up of individuals, and 6.80% had someone living alone who was 65 years of age or older. The average household size was 3.26 and the average family size was 2.93.

The village's age distribution consisted of 29.4% under the age of 18, 9.5% from 18 to 24, 25% from 25 to 44, 27.7% from 45 to 64, and 8.4% who were 65 years of age or older. The median age was 37.4 years. For every 100 females, there were 86.8 males. For every 100 females age 18 and over, there were 85.8 males.

The median income for a household in the village was $113,871, and the median income for a family was $122,585. Males had a median income of $70,487 versus $42,898 for females. The per capita income for the village was $41,978. About 0.8% of families and 2.2% of the population were below the poverty line, including none of those under age 18 and none of those age 65 or over.

Forest preserves 

The most popular tourist attractions in Mahomet are all Champaign County Forest Preserve District properties: Lake of the Woods Park and its award-winning Hartwell C. Howard Golf Course, and the River Bend Forest Preserve. Lake of the Woods Forest Preserve is a  park along the Sangamon River. The park features a botanical garden, a lake, a picturesque covered bridge and also offers activities like boating, fishing, cross country skiing, and sledding. Within Lake of the Woods Park is the Museum of the Grand Prairie (formerly called the Early American Museum), which has a collection that features life in the 19th and early 20th century in East-Central Illinois. The park has a  bike path and a bell tower. The Hartwell C. Howard Golf Course is an 18-hole regulation course, a 9-hole par 3 course, and a practice range.

Mahomet schools 

The Mahomet School District has 2,980 students and 183 instructors spread over five schools.

History 

The village of Mahomet was first settled in 1832 on the banks of the Sangamon River. It was the first community to be established in modern-day Champaign County. The original village name was Middletown, possibly because it is half-way between the towns of Danville and Bloomington. In 1871, the name of the village was changed to Mahomet because there was already another Middletown in Illinois, which was causing mail problems. Most early settlers came from Ohio, Virginia, Kentucky, and Pennsylvania and chose to reside in Mahomet because there was abundant water from the Sangamon River and abundant trees.

The town's own published account credits their founder Daniel T. Porter, who had Connecticut roots, as the one who denominated both the new village as Middletown (after Middletown, Connecticut) and the post office as Mahomet (after Mahomet Weyonomon, a Mohegan sachem from Connecticut). With the arrival of the railroad, the town embraced the name of its post office in 1871 because there already was a Middletown, Illinois. However, alternative theories of the origin of the name "Mahomet" also exist. One derives the word from the "Mahomet Lodge," the local Masonic Lodge at the time the town was searching for a new name. Its use as the name of the lodge was a manifestation of the Freemasons' liberal use of religious names and stonemason tools and symbols. Alternatively, the town's name was arbitrarily assigned when the conflicting names were noted by the US Postal Service. Another theory proposes Muhammad as the town's namesake.

In 2007, the citizens of Mahomet voted to repeal the alcohol prohibition order that had been in place since World War II.

Notable people 
 Jason Seaman, teacher who intervened during the 2018 Noblesville West Middle School shooting
 Melanie Paxson

Points of interest 
 Mabery Gelvin Botanical Garden
 Hazen Bridge - A registered historical bridge northeast on Mahomet.
 Mahomet Public Library

Notes

External links

Village of Mahomet Illinois, Web site
Mahomet-Seymour Schools web site
Mahomet-Seymour Alumni web site

Villages in Champaign County, Illinois
Villages in Illinois
Populated places established in 1832
1832 establishments in Illinois